N-acetylphosphatidylethanolamine-hydrolysing phospholipase D (EC 3.1.4.54, NAPE-PLD, anandamide-generating phospholipase D, N-acyl phosphatidylethanolamine phospholipase D, NAPE-hydrolyzing phospholipase D) is an enzyme with systematic name ''N-acetylphosphatidylethanolamine phosphatidohydrolase. It catalyses the following chemical reaction

 N''-acylphosphatidylethanolamine + H2O  N-acylethanolamine + a 1,2-diacylglycerol 3-phosphate

This enzyme is involved in the biosynthesis of anandamide.

See Also 

 Endocannabinoid System
 N-acyl phosphatidylethanolamine

References

External links 
 
 N-acyl phosphatidylethanolamine phospholipase D (NAPEPLD ((C7orf18, FMP30, NAPE-PLD)) Human Protein Atlas

EC 3.1.4